Ryan M. Milner is a writer and professor in the communications department of the College of Charleston in South Carolina. He teaches several courses on modern media technology and digital communications. His primary field of study is focused on the effects of the internet on society and how people respond differently to emerging technologies.

Education and career 
Milner graduated in 2012 from the University of Kansas with a PhD in communication studies. His thesis was titled "The World Made Meme", and a book version of it was later published in 2016.

Milner has been a professor of Communications at the College of Charleston since 2012. The various topics he teaches include digital media, research methods, free speech and podcasting, and media ethics.

Milner has written several books and articles based on his research on internet culture and online communication. He studies how the internet affects people through many different aspects of society.

Publications 
Milner has written two published books as well as dozens of journal articles. He has also done research on video games as a tool of mediated communication and a device of entertainment on the same tier as other types of media such as films, TV shows, and books.

 Books 

 
 

 Journals articles 

 "Working for The Text: Fan labor and the New Organization" (2009), article.
 "Contested Convergence and the Politics of Play on GameTrailers.com" (2013), article.
 "Pop Polyvocality: Internet Memes, Public Participation, and the Occupy Wall Street Movement" (2013), journal.

Research

The World Made Meme: Public Conversations and Participatory Media (2016 book) 
This book explores the cultural importance of internet memes. Memes can appear in many forms such as images, videos, texts, audio samples, etc. Every day, memes are created, combined, changed, and shared by countless people across the internet. Memes serve as a unique tool of communication. They not only are used as a basis for comedy but they are also used to make universal statements that can connect people based on familiarity. In “The World Made Meme”, Ryan Milner analyzes the cultural phenomenon of this contemporary communication. He breaks down the vast tapestry of collective conversation in meme culture.

The Ambivalent Internet: Mischief, Oddity, and Antagonism Online (2017 book) 
Co-written by Whitney Phillips and Ryan Milner, “The Ambivalent Internet” analyzes the constantly fluctuating tonality of the world wide web. Because the internet is so vast and contributed to by billions of people, it’s impossible to categorize the entirety of the web as either good, bad or anything in between. The authors argue that the tools given to internet users are neutral by default and that these tools will be used differently depending on the individuals intentions. Overall, there is nothing that can be said or done on the internet that will surprise people anymore. Internet culture is typically known for its outrageous and often antagonizing content. With that being said, “The Ambivalent Internet” goes into depth as to why people behave differently on the internet and why it is important for us to understand the intent behind these behaviors.

Achievements 
Milner has contributed to articles for multiple news outlets such as TIME, Slate, The Los Angeles Review of Books, NBC News, and The New York Times.

In 2017, Milner had an art exhibit featured at Loyola University's School of Communication in Chicago, Illinois. The featured exhibit told the story of the history of internet memes over the past decade (2007-2017). The purpose of the exhibit was to have people see these memes as more than just quick jokes we scroll through on social media. His goal was to make people reflect on these images as a communicative form of satirical commentary on both pop culture and news stories.

References 

Living people
Year of birth missing (living people)
Place of birth missing (living people)
College of Charleston faculty
Digital media educators
American mass media scholars
University of Kansas alumni
Media studies writers